Frédéric Eyschen (18 December 1902 – 30 May 1960) was a Luxembourgian sprinter. He competed in the men's 100 metres at the 1928 Summer Olympics. He also played football as a forward, and appeared three times for the Luxembourg national team.

References

1902 births
1960 deaths
Athletes (track and field) at the 1928 Summer Olympics
Luxembourgian male sprinters
Olympic athletes of Luxembourg
Place of birth missing
Luxembourgian footballers
Luxembourg international footballers
Association football forwards